In probability theory, an interacting particle system (IPS) is a stochastic process  on some configuration space  given by a site space, a countable-infinite graph  and a local state space, a compact metric space . More precisely IPS are continuous-time Markov jump processes describing the collective behavior of stochastically interacting components. IPS are the continuous-time analogue of stochastic cellular automata.

Among the main examples are the voter model, the contact process, the asymmetric simple exclusion process (ASEP), the Glauber dynamics and in particular the stochastic Ising model.

IPS are usually defined via their Markov generator giving rise to a unique Markov process using Markov semigroups and the Hille-Yosida theorem. The rates describe exponential waiting times of the process to jump from configuration  into configuration .

The generator  of an IPS has the following form.

.

where  is the configuration equal to  except it is flipped at site .  is a new parameter modeling the inverse temperature.

The Voter model

The voter model (usually in continuous time, but there are discrete versions as well) is a process similar to the contact process.  In this process  is taken to represent a voter's attitude on a particular topic.  Voters reconsider their opinions at times distributed according to independent exponential random variables (this gives a Poisson process locally – note that there are in general infinitely many voters so no global Poisson process can be used). At times of reconsideration, a voter chooses one neighbor uniformly from amongst all neighbors and takes that neighbor's opinion. One can generalize the process by allowing the picking of neighbors to be something other than uniform.

Discrete time process

In the discrete time voter model in one dimension,  represents the state of particle  at time . Informally each individual is arranged on a line and can "see" other individuals that are within a radius, . If more than a certain proportion,  of these people disagree then the individual changes her attitude, otherwise she keeps it the same.

This process has a natural generalization to more dimensions, some results for this are discussed in Durrett and Steif (1993).

Continuous time process

The continuous time process is similar in that it imagines each individual has a belief at a time and changes it based on the attitudes of its neighbors.  The process is described informally by Liggett (1985, 226), "Periodically (i.e., at independent exponential times), an individual reassesses his view in a rather simple way: he chooses a 'friend' at random with certain probabilities and adopts his position."  A model was constructed with this interpretation by Holley and Liggett (1975).

This process is equivalent to a process first suggested by Clifford and Sudbury (1973) where animals are in conflict over territory and are equally matched.  A site is selected to be invaded by a neighbor at a given time.

References 

 
 
 

Lattice models
Self-organization
Complex systems theory
Spatial processes
Markov models